Christopher Tufton is a Jamaican politician. A member of the governing Jamaica Labour Party, and Jamaica's Minister of Health and Wellness. He previously served as the Minister of Industry, Investment and Commerce from July 2011 to December 2011, having previously served as the Minister of Agriculture and Fisheries since 2007. Tufton served as the Member of Parliament for parliamentary constituency St. Elizabeth South Western from 2007 up until his defeat in 2011. In 2016 Tufton won the St. Catherine West Central seat against the PNP's Clinton Clarke and thus being returned to the Lower House.

He was the president of the Generation 2000 and a lecturer in the Department of Management Studies, UWI, Mona. In 2011 Tufton lost his seat to his PNP counterpart Hugh Buchanan.

He is a former talk show host and columnist. He holds a Doctorate in Business Administration (DBA) from the Manchester Business School.

Tufton is married to Neadene Shields-Tufton with three children.

References

External links 

 Hon. Dr. Christopher Tufton – Minister of Agriculture and Fisheries
 JLP Candidates and MP's: Dr. Christopher Tufton

Year of birth missing (living people)
Living people
Jamaica Labour Party politicians
Georgia State University alumni
University of the West Indies alumni
Ministers of Health of Jamaica
Members of the 11th Parliament of Jamaica
Members of the 13th Parliament of Jamaica
Members of the 14th Parliament of Jamaica